An ijzerkoekje ('iron cookie') is a soft cookie, traditionally eaten by Dutch fishermen, especially in Vlaardingen, one of the main harbours of the Netherlands during the 19th and 20th centuries. It is an oval cookie around 0.6-0.7 cm thick with a cinnamon 'creamy' taste. The cookies were invented in the city of Vlaardingen and are baked on a checkered iron plate, creating a characteristic waffle-like pattern, similar to stroopwafels.

Origin 
According to oral history, the grocer "Daatje de Koe" (1838–1915) made the first Vlaardingse iron cookies. Afterwards, the product was introduced in the assortment of various city bakers.

Research of the Vlaardingen baker Hazenberg in regional archives showed that the cookie is probably older and dates from the 18th century.

Because of the composition of the dough, the cookies remain tasty for a long time. This made them popular amongst fishermen. These cookies also have a high food energy (calories) value, and have been taken to the sea for that reason, too.

Today, most pastry shops in Vlaardingen sell ijzerkoekjes. Also, special waffle irons are available as well as "ijzerkoekje flour" for baking the cookies at home.

Recipe 
The recipe varies, but this is seen as the original of one of the bakeries in Vlaardingen:
 For about 35 cookies it takes:
  flour (if possible the Zeeland type of flour, i.e. flour from wheat grown in an oceanic climate zone)
  white or brown sugar
  of butter (or margarine)
 Cinnamon to taste
 Salt

Some opt for relatively more flour and add milk or water, egg or egg yolk, spices, and/or vanilla.

 According to the original recipe, after mixing the ingredients, the dough should rest for half a day in the refrigerator, though not everybody does it.
 Then cook on both sides over medium heat on an iron cookies iron, a few minutes per side.

Sri Lanka 
In Sri Lanka, biscuits are also known under the name ijzerkoekje. These are considered to be local cuisine. This variety originated within the Burgher community, an ethically mixed population group, with partly European ancestors, including the Dutch Burghers. The cookies are called 'ijzer' or 'ijzer koekje' and are made with wheat flour, sugar, egg, coconut milk, cinnamon, cloves and salt. Butter or oil is only used to grease the baking iron. The iron biscuits are rolled around a 1-1.5 cm diameter stick immediately after baking. According to the book 'Sweet Treats around the World' they are related to Dutch stroopwafels, which however, are larger, contains syrup and relatively more flour and are baked in a waffle iron.

See also

References

External links
YouTube

Dutch cuisine
Cookies
Dutch confectionery
Vlaardingen